Archibald Bell (19 August 1905 – 19 January 1978) was an Australian rules footballer who played for the Geelong Football Club in the Victorian Football League (VFL).

Notes

External links 

1905 births
1978 deaths
Australian rules footballers from Victoria (Australia)
Geelong Football Club players
People educated at Geelong College